The Lalit Narayan Mithila University (LNMU), formerly Mithila University, is a public university in India. Began in 1972, the university initially functioned from the Mohanpur House at Sara Mohanpur village of Darbhanga-Sakri route. In 1975, it was shifted to the campus belonging to Raj Darbhanga.

The university is in Darbhanga town, Mithila, an ancient cultural region of North India lies between the lower range of the Himalayas and the Ganges river. The university imparts education in fields such as humanities, social science, life science, commerce, and medicine, with both undergraduate and postgraduate courses. More than 400 faculties are engaged in teaching and research.

The institute has a residential campus of about 230 acres with modern facilities and support services for its students and faculty. The university has the privilege of having major Students' union asNSUI , AISF,JAAP JDU RJD , ABVP Student Unions.

Colleges
Its jurisdiction extends over 4 districts -Begusarai, Darbhanga, Madhubani,  Samastipur.

Constituent colleges

Affiliated Colleges

Departments

 Department of Ancient Indian History
 Department of Bio-technology 
 Department of Botany 
 Department of Physics
 Department of Chemistry 
 Department of Commerce & Business Administration 
 Department of Economics 
 Department of English
 Department of Hindi 
 Department of Geography
 Department of Home Science 
 Department of Maithili 
 Department of Political Science 
 Department of Psychology 
 Department of Sanskrit 
 Department of Sociology
 Department of Sports & Culture
 Department of Urdu
 Department of Zoology
 Department of Mathematics
 Department of Music and Dramatics

 Department of Sports
 Department of Philosophy

Major Buildings
 Nagendra Jha Stadium
 Jubilee Hall
 Nargauna Palace
 Gandhi Guest House
 Muiltipurpose Hall

Notable alumni
 Gopal Jee Thakur, Member of Parliament From Darbhanga (Lok Sabha Constituency) 
 Simon Britto Rodrigues, Former  Member of the Kerala Legislative Assembly
 Subrata Roy

Notable faculty alumni
Saket Kushwaha Vice Chancellor of Rajiv Gandhi University. Former Vice Chancellor of Lalit Narayan Mithila University

References

External links

 
Universities in Bihar
Mithila
Education in Darbhanga
Educational institutions established in 1972
1972 establishments in Bihar